Wernbongam Stream Section and Quarry is a Site of Special Scientific Interest in Carmarthen & Dinefwr,  Wales.

References

See also
List of Sites of Special Scientific Interest in Carmarthen & Dinefwr

Sites of Special Scientific Interest in Carmarthen & Dinefwr
Quarries in Wales